Ambarnath (also spelled Ambernath) is a railway station on the Central Line of the Mumbai Suburban Railway network. It is an important terminus for local commuters. 

Ambarnath is famous for its namesake Ambreshwar mandir, a temple dedicated to Shiva and therefore commonly known as Shivmandir. This temple was built in 1060 CE and is included in the small list of historically very important places in India by UNESCO.

As per 2011 census the population of Ambarnath was 254,003 but it has risen by 2016. The city is an important industrial hub M.I.D.C of Ambarnath has 162 large-scale manufacturing units with many international companies having their plants there.

The city of Ambarnath became notable when an ordnance factory was set up during the British rule. This factory produces ammunition for the Indian army along with shielded vehicles on a large scale.

Gallery

References

Kalyan-Lonavala rail line
Railway stations in Thane district
Mumbai Suburban Railway stations
Mumbai CR railway division
Ambarnath